The Kovrov constituency (No.69) was a Russian legislative constituency in Vladimir Oblast in 1993–2007. The constituency was based in eastern Vladimir Oblast, however, in 2016 Vladimir Oblast constituencies were redrawn with Vladimir constituency taking most of Kovrov constituency.

Members elected

Election results

1993

|-
! colspan=2 style="background-color:#E9E9E9;text-align:left;vertical-align:top;" |Candidate
! style="background-color:#E9E9E9;text-align:left;vertical-align:top;" |Party
! style="background-color:#E9E9E9;text-align:right;" |Votes
! style="background-color:#E9E9E9;text-align:right;" |%
|-
|style="background-color:"|
|align=left|Yevgeny Buchenkov
|align=left|Agrarian Party
|
|43.68%
|-
|style="background-color:"|
|align=left|Yevgeny Saburov
|align=left|Independent
| -
|26.30%
|-
| colspan="5" style="background-color:#E9E9E9;"|
|- style="font-weight:bold"
| colspan="3" style="text-align:left;" | Total
| 
| 100%
|-
| colspan="5" style="background-color:#E9E9E9;"|
|- style="font-weight:bold"
| colspan="4" |Source:
|
|}

1995

|-
! colspan=2 style="background-color:#E9E9E9;text-align:left;vertical-align:top;" |Candidate
! style="background-color:#E9E9E9;text-align:left;vertical-align:top;" |Party
! style="background-color:#E9E9E9;text-align:right;" |Votes
! style="background-color:#E9E9E9;text-align:right;" |%
|-
|style="background-color:"|
|align=left|Yevgeny Buchenkov (incumbent)
|align=left|Communist Party
|
|21.13%
|-
|style="background-color:"|
|align=left|Sergey Knyazkov
|align=left|Independent
|
|16.07%
|-
|style="background-color:#2C299A"|
|align=left|Igor Trifonov
|align=left|Congress of Russian Communities
|
|10.51%
|-
|style="background-color:"|
|align=left|Vladimir Zaychikov
|align=left|Independent
|
|10.14%
|-
|style="background-color:"|
|align=left|Boris Zhukov
|align=left|Liberal Democratic Party
|
|9.44%
|-
|style="background-color:#D50000"|
|align=left|Aleksandr Merkushev
|align=left|Communists and Working Russia - for the Soviet Union
|
|3.98%
|-
|style="background-color:"|
|align=left|Boris Andrianov
|align=left|Independent
|
|3.36%
|-
|style="background-color:#DA2021"|
|align=left|Lyudmila Nemchinova
|align=left|Ivan Rybkin Bloc
|
|3.04%
|-
|style="background-color:"|
|align=left|Nikolay Sarafannikov
|align=left|Independent
|
|2.86%
|-
|style="background-color:"|
|align=left|Vladimir Rameykov
|align=left|Independent
|
|2.51%
|-
|style="background-color:#A8A821"|
|align=left|Aleksandr Kardanov
|align=left|Stable Russia
|
|1.35%
|-
|style="background-color:#000000"|
|colspan=2 |against all
|
|12.51%
|-
| colspan="5" style="background-color:#E9E9E9;"|
|- style="font-weight:bold"
| colspan="3" style="text-align:left;" | Total
| 
| 100%
|-
| colspan="5" style="background-color:#E9E9E9;"|
|- style="font-weight:bold"
| colspan="4" |Source:
|
|}

1999

|-
! colspan=2 style="background-color:#E9E9E9;text-align:left;vertical-align:top;" |Candidate
! style="background-color:#E9E9E9;text-align:left;vertical-align:top;" |Party
! style="background-color:#E9E9E9;text-align:right;" |Votes
! style="background-color:#E9E9E9;text-align:right;" |%
|-
|style="background-color:"|
|align=left|Viktor Pautov
|align=left|Communist Party
|
|19.54%
|-
|style="background:#1042A5"| 
|align=left|Yury Vlasov
|align=left|Union of Right Forces
|
|15.79%
|-
|style="background-color:"|
|align=left|Andrey Yepishov
|align=left|Independent
|
|7.95%
|-
|style="background-color:"|
|align=left|Sergey Konin
|align=left|Independent
|
|6.62%
|-
|style="background-color:"|
|align=left|Igor Trifonov
|align=left|Independent
|
|6.45%
|-
|style="background-color:#FF4400"|
|align=left|Nina Chaykovskaya
|align=left|Andrey Nikolayev and Svyatoslav Fyodorov Bloc
|
|5.62%
|-
|style="background-color:"|
|align=left|Konstantin Morozov
|align=left|Yabloko
|
|5.43%
|-
|style="background-color:"|
|align=left|Sergey Shokhrin
|align=left|Independent
|
|5.41%
|-
|style="background-color:#7C273A"|
|align=left|Yevgeny Buchenkov (incumbent)
|align=left|Movement in Support of the Army
|
|5.02%
|-
|style="background-color:"|
|align=left|Natalia Zabolotnaya
|align=left|Our Home – Russia
|
|3.54%
|-
|style="background-color:"|
|align=left|Pyotr Sukhorukov
|align=left|Independent
|
|2.40%
|-
|style="background-color:#3B9EDF"|
|align=left|Nikolay Mokrov
|align=left|Fatherland – All Russia
|
|1.73%
|-
|style="background-color:#000000"|
|colspan=2 |against all
|
|11.43%
|-
| colspan="5" style="background-color:#E9E9E9;"|
|- style="font-weight:bold"
| colspan="3" style="text-align:left;" | Total
| 
| 100%
|-
| colspan="5" style="background-color:#E9E9E9;"|
|- style="font-weight:bold"
| colspan="4" |Source:
|
|}

2003

|-
! colspan=2 style="background-color:#E9E9E9;text-align:left;vertical-align:top;" |Candidate
! style="background-color:#E9E9E9;text-align:left;vertical-align:top;" |Party
! style="background-color:#E9E9E9;text-align:right;" |Votes
! style="background-color:#E9E9E9;text-align:right;" |%
|-
|style="background-color:"|
|align=left|Viktor Pautov (incumbent)
|align=left|Independent
|
|35.34%
|-
|style="background-color:"|
|align=left|Oleg Kotrov
|align=left|United Russia
|
|13.69%
|-
|style="background-color:"|
|align=left|Dmitry Bodrov
|align=left|Liberal Democratic Party
|
|7.20%
|-
|style="background-color:"|
|align=left|Oleg Zamorin
|align=left|Independent
|
|6.54%
|-
|style="background-color:"|
|align=left|Igor Trifonov
|align=left|Independent
|
|5.90%
|-
|style="background-color:#00A1FF"|
|align=left|Vadim Melkov
|align=left|Party of Russia's Rebirth-Russian Party of Life
|
|5.60%
|-
|style="background-color:"|
|align=left|Tatyana Chertoritskaya
|align=left|Independent
|
|2.97%
|-
|style="background:#1042A5"| 
|align=left|Anatoly Gusev
|align=left|Union of Right Forces
|
|2.42%
|-
|style="background-color:"|
|align=left|Valery Kuzin
|align=left|Independent
|
|1.98%
|-
|style="background-color:#7C73CC"|
|align=left|Igor Shubnikov
|align=left|Great Russia – Eurasian Union
|
|1.53%
|-
|style="background-color:#000000"|
|colspan=2 |against all
|
|14.50%
|-
| colspan="5" style="background-color:#E9E9E9;"|
|- style="font-weight:bold"
| colspan="3" style="text-align:left;" | Total
| 
| 100%
|-
| colspan="5" style="background-color:#E9E9E9;"|
|- style="font-weight:bold"
| colspan="4" |Source:
|
|}

Notes

References

Obsolete Russian legislative constituencies
Politics of Vladimir Oblast